Alar Nääme (born 21 December 1983 in Valga) is an Estonian politician. He was the Deputy Mayor of Valga and the District Mayor of Kesklinn, Tallinn and was a member of the XIII Riigikogu, representing the Estonian Centre Party.

On 23 June 2016, Harju County court found Nääme guilty of embezzlement. He was ordered to pay a pecuniary punishment of €6,300.

References

Living people
1983 births
Estonian Centre Party politicians
Members of the Riigikogu, 2015–2019
People from Valga, Estonia